Gary Dark (28 November 1944 – 22 September 1971) was  a former Australian rules footballer who played with Footscray in the Victorian Football League (VFL).

Notes

External links 
		

1944 births
1971 deaths
Australian rules footballers from Victoria (Australia)
Western Bulldogs players